The following lists events that happened during 1996 in Laos.

Incumbents
President: Nouhak Phoumsavanh 
Vice President: Sisavath Keobounphanh (starting unknown date)
Prime Minister: Khamtai Siphandon

Events

March
18-20 March - 6th Congress of the Lao People's Revolutionary Party

References

 
Years of the 20th century in Laos
Laos
1990s in Laos
Laos